Halfrican may refer to:
 Afro Latinos*
 Afro-Asian
 Mulatto
 Multiracial